The 2001 Northeast Conference baseball tournament began on May 11 and ended on May 13, 2001, at The Sandcastle in Atlantic City, New Jersey.  The league's top four teams competed in the double elimination tournament.  Third-seeded  won their first and only tournament championship and earned the Northeast Conference's automatic bid to the 2001 NCAA Division I baseball tournament.

Seeding and format
The two division winners claimed the top two seeds, with the next two teams by conference winning percentage rounding out the field.  They played a double-elimination tournament.

Bracket

Most Valuable Player
Eric Weltmer of UMBC was named Tournament Most Valuable Player.  Weltmer threw a pair of complete games in the tournament, including the final, with a 2.50 ERA.

References

Tournament
Northeast Conference Baseball Tournament
Northeast Conference baseball tournament
Northeast Conference baseball tournament